Arthur Fulton may refer to:
 Arthur Fulton (sport shooter)
 Arthur Fulton (engineer)